Ganza, also known as Ganzo or Koma, is an Omotic language spoken in the Al Kurumik District of the Blue Nile (state) in Sudan and in the western Benishangul-Gumuz region of Ethiopia, specifically in the village districts of Penishuba and Yabeldigis.

It also goes by the names Ganzo, Gwami, Koma, and Koma-Ganza.

Phonology

Ganza does not utilize consonant length phonemically.

Although vowel length is typically contrastive in Omotic languages, Ganza does not have a clear contrast between long and short vowel phonemes. Instead, Ganza has predictable utterance-final vowel
lengthening and a set of monosyllabic words with double vowels.

References
Smolders, Joshua. 2015. A Wordlist of Ganza. Addis Ababa: SIL Ethiopia

Notes

External links 
 Link to ELAR documentation of Ganza and Ganza verb mophology 

Languages of Ethiopia
Omotic languages
Mao languages